Marcel Sökler (born 26 March 1991) is a German footballer who plays as a striker for SGV Freiberg.

Career
Sökler began his professional career with 1. FC Saarbrücken, whom he joined in July 2012, and made his 3. Liga debut as a substitute for his brother, Sven, in a 1–0 win over VfB Stuttgart II. He moved to SV Waldhof Mannheim in July 2013.

References

External links

1991 births
Living people
German footballers
TSG 1899 Hoffenheim II players
1. FC Saarbrücken players
SV Waldhof Mannheim players
VfB Stuttgart II players
SGV Freiberg players
3. Liga players
Regionalliga players
Oberliga (football) players
Association football forwards